Border Saddlemates is a 1952 American Western film directed by William Witney and written by Albert DeMond. The film stars Rex Allen, Mary Ellen Kay, Slim Pickens, Roy Barcroft, Forrest Taylor and Jimmy Moss. The film was released on April 15, 1952, by Republic Pictures.

Plot

Cast
Rex Allen as Dr. Rex Allen
Koko as Koko 
Mary Ellen Kay as Jane Richards
Slim Pickens as Slim Pickens
Roy Barcroft as Steve Baxter
Forrest Taylor as Mel Richards
Jimmy Moss as Danny Richards 
Zon Murray as Matt Lacey
Keith McConnell as Constable Gene Dalton
Mark Hanna as Manero
The Republic Rhythm Riders as Musicians

References

External links 
 

1952 films
American Western (genre) films
1952 Western (genre) films
Republic Pictures films
Films directed by William Witney
American black-and-white films
1950s English-language films
1950s American films